Hans Molisch (6 December 1856, Brünn, Habsburg Moravia - 8 December 1937, Wien, Austria) was a Czech-Austrian botanist.

Molisch's test is named after him, it is a sensitive chemical test for the presence of carbohydrates.

He taught as a professor at the German University of Prague (1894-), Vienna University (1909-1928), Tohoku Imperial University (now Tohoku University, Japan; 1922–1925), and the Bose Institute in Kolkata India;1928-

From 1931 to 1937 he acted as the vice-president of the Austrian Academy of Sciences.

Hans Molisch expanded on Julius von Sachs's work by developing ´starch pictures´ in intact leaves by using actual photographic negatives as masks over the illuminated leaves.

In his function as rector of the University of Vienna in 1926/27, Molisch was responsible for a wave of radicalization among the anti-Semitic and German-national students. The escalating violence against politically dissenters in general and Jewish students in particular was promoted by Molisch and demonstrated by appropriate leniency in punishing the perpetrators. At the university he was considered an open sponsor of the "swastika people".

Literary works 
 Die Pflanzen in ihren Beziehungen zum Eisen, 1892
 Leuchtende Pflanzen, 1904
 Die Purpurbakterien, 1907
 Die Eisenbakterien, 1910
 Mikrochemie der Pflanzen, 1913
 Pflanzenphysiologie, 1920
 Pflanzenphysiologie in Japan, 1926
 Im Lande der aufgehenden Sonne, 1927

References

External links 
 

1856 births
1937 deaths
Scientists from Brno
People from the Margraviate of Moravia
19th-century Austrian botanists
Academic staff of Tohoku University
Austrian people of Moravian-German descent
Academic staff of the University of Vienna
Members of the Prussian Academy of Sciences
Members of the Austrian Academy of Sciences
20th-century Austrian botanists